Mill Creek is a  long 3rd order tributary to the Trent River in Jones County, North Carolina.

Course
Mill Creek rises about 4 miles east of Pollocksville, North Carolina in Croatan National Forest and then flows southwest then turns northwest to join the Trent River at Pollocksville.

Watershed
Mill Creek drains  of area, receives about 55.0 in/year of precipitation, has a wetness index of 642.15, and is about 17% forested.

See also
List of rivers of North Carolina

References

Rivers of North Carolina
Rivers of Jones County, North Carolina